China O'Brien II is a 1990 martial arts film produced by Golden Harvest Studios and directed by Robert Clouse. It stars Cynthia Rothrock, Richard Norton and Keith Cooke and is a sequel to the 1990 film China O'Brien.

Plot

Thanks to Sheriff China O'Brien (Cynthia Rothrock), Beaver Creek, Utah has been designated the safest community in the state. But the town once again becomes unsafe when it becomes the hideout of escaped drug kingpin Charlie Baskin (Harlow Marks).

Baskin wants revenge on an ex-associate, Frank Atkins (Frank Magner), who testified against Baskin and is now residing in Beaver Creek with some embezzled drug money that Baskin wants back.

When Baskin starts terrorizing Frank, China and her deputies Matt Conroy (Richard Norton) and Dakota (Keith Cooke) help Frank fend off Baskin and his henchmen. Baskin kidnaps Frank's wife Annie Atkins (Tricia Quai) and his daughter Jill Atkins (Tiffany Soter), luring China, Matt, Dakota, and Frank into a confrontation against Baskin.

Cast
 Cynthia Rothrock as Sheriff Lori 'China' O'Brien
 Richard Norton as Deputy Sheriff Matt Conroy
 Keith Cooke as Deputy Sheriff Dakota
 Frank Magner as Frank Atkins
 Harlow Marks as Charlie Baskin
 Nelson Woodbury as Reporter #2

Production
Parts of the film were shot in Park City, Utah.

Reception

The film is regarded by fans as being on equal footing with the original in terms of both martial arts action and production quality although it was criticised for once again having an aging villain with no fighting skills, who offered no final confrontation.

Both films became video rental store staples for martial arts fans and were released as a double VHS in 1991.

References

External links

1990 films
1990s action films
1990 martial arts films
American action films
American martial arts films
Films directed by Robert Clouse
American sequel films
1990s English-language films
1990s American films